Michael J. Salvino is an American business executive. He has been president and CEO of DXC Technology since September 2019.

Prior to joining DXC Technology, his previous roles include managing director of Carrick Capital Partners, group chief executive of Accenture Operations, managing director of Business Process Outsourcing for Accenture Operations, and executive vice-president for North American client sales and accounts at Exult, Inc.

Education
Salvino attended Marietta College, where he earned a Bachelor of Science in industrial engineering in 1987. Salvino was a starter for the Marietta Pioneers, the school’s basketball team, where he was a forward.

Career
Salvino’s first major position was with Andersen Consulting, where he became an associate partner in 1997. He later left the company for Exult Inc. By 2003, he had been promoted to executive vice-president for North American client sales and accounts at Exult, and by April 2004, he was the company’s president for the Americas region.
Before he left for Accenture in 2006, Salvino had been appointed global sales and accounts co-leader for Hewitt's human resources outsourcing group, which had acquired Exult.

Salvino joined Accenture in 2006 to serve as managing director of Business Process Outsourcing (BPO). In September 2009, he was named Group Chief Executive of Business Process Outsourcing.

In 2014, Salvino became group chief executive of Accenture Operations. As of 2016, when he left Accenture Operations, Salvino supervised 100,000 employees, with the division generating $7 billion in annual revenue.

In 2016, Salvino joined Carrick Capital Partners as one of the firm’s operating partners. He later became a managing director.

In May 2019, Salvino joined the board of directors of DXC Technology, and in September of that same year, he became CEO of the company. 

In 2020, Salvino oversaw a deal to sell DXC's state and local health and human services business to Veritas Capital for $5 billion.

In 2021, Salvino rejected an offer from French IT firm Atos to acquire DXC. Salvino said the bid undervalued the company based on recent quarterly gains.

In May 2022, Salvino was appointed as the chairman of DXC's board, taking over Ian Read following his retirement in July 2022.

Other professional activities 
As of 2021, Salvino also serves on multiple boards outside of DXC Technology, including those of the Atrium Health Foundation, Marietta College, and the Duke University Pratt School of Engineering. Salvino delivered the 2021 commencement address for Marietta’s graduating class and was awarded an honorary doctorate degree.

Personal life
Salvino lives in Charlotte, North Carolina. He and his wife Denise have three children.

References

Living people
Marietta College alumni
American chief executives of Fortune 500 companies
American technology chief executives
21st-century American businesspeople
Year of birth missing (living people)